David James Fletcher Hunt, Baron Hunt of Wirral,  (born 21 May 1942) is a British Conservative politician who served as a member of the Cabinet under the Thatcher and Major administrations, and was appointed to the Privy Council in 1990.

Education
Hunt was educated at Liverpool College, an independent school for boys (now co-educational), in Liverpool, at the time in Lancashire (and now in Merseyside), followed by the University of Bristol, where he studied Law. In 1965, representing the university, he won The Observer Mace debating competition, speaking with Bob Marshall Andrews (who would also go on to become an MP, for Labour.) In 1995, the competition was renamed the John Smith Memorial Mace, and is now run by the English-Speaking Union.

Early life
Born in Glyn Ceiriog in 1942, the son of former Royal Naval Reserves Officer Alan N Hunt OBE and Jessie E E Northrop, David Hunt was the middle child of three, with two sisters.
Growing up, David was an active member of the Young Conservatives where he was inspired into running for political office for the Conservative Party.

Parliamentary career
Hunt unsuccessfully contested Bristol South in 1970. In the 1973 Birthday Honours, he was appointed to the Order of the British Empire as a Member (MBE) for 'political services in the West of England'. He then unsuccessfully contested Kingswood in 1974. Hunt became the Member of Parliament for Wirral after winning a by-election in 1976. The seat was broken up and Hunt became Member of Parliament for the new Wirral West constituency in 1983.

In Government
In Government he served as a whip and junior minister under Margaret Thatcher, who made him Secretary of State for Wales in 1990, shortly before her resignation later that year. In the 1990 Conservative Leadership election he is widely believed to have been the only member of the Cabinet to vote for Michael Heseltine on the first ballot. He remained at the Welsh Office until 1993, then served as Secretary of State for Employment from 1993 to 1994 and as Chancellor of the Duchy of Lancaster from 1994 to 1995. In the Cabinet reshuffle of 1995, Hunt was offered the position of Health Secretary which was turned down, that position then going to Stephen Dorrell. He briefly returned to the Welsh Office, whilst remaining Chancellor of the Duchy of Lancaster, for two weeks during the leadership election in mid-1995 as acting Secretary of State for Wales after the incumbent, John Redwood stepped down in order to be a candidate.

He lost his seat in the Labour landslide at the 1997 general election.

Peerage
In the 1997 Prime Minister's Resignation Honours, he was raised to the peerage as Baron Hunt of Wirral of Wirral in the county of Merseyside. Lord Hunt was senior partner at the national law firm Beachcroft Wansbroughs (now DAC Beachcroft) between 1996 and 2005. He is now chairman of the firm's financial services division and is regarded as a major figure in the world of insurance and financial services. On certain Bills he used to occasionally step back up to the opposition front bench in the House of Lords, on an ad hoc basis. On 7 October 2008, David Cameron formally appointed him to the front bench to shadow Peter Mandelson in the House of Lords on Department for Business, Enterprise and Regulatory Reform matters.

Hunt was awarded an honorary Doctor of Laws degree by the University of Bristol on 21 February 2008. He is vice-president of the Holocaust Educational Trust. He became chairman of the Press Complaints Commission on 17 October 2011. In December 2011 he recommended closing the PCC and replacing it with an alternative independent press regulator.

Arms

Notes

External links
 
Profile  at the Conservative Party website
Profile at Beachcroft LLP

|-

|-

|-

|-

|-

|-

Alumni of the University of Bristol
British Secretaries of State for Employment
Chancellors of the Duchy of Lancaster
Conservative Party (UK) MPs for English constituencies
Conservative Party (UK) life peers
Life peers created by Elizabeth II
Living people
Members of the Order of the British Empire
Members of the Privy Council of the United Kingdom
People educated at Liverpool College
Politics of the Metropolitan Borough of Wirral
Secretaries of State for Wales
Treasurers of the Household
UK MPs 1974–1979
UK MPs 1979–1983
UK MPs 1983–1987
UK MPs 1987–1992
UK MPs 1992–1997
1942 births